Pandorina is a genus of green algae composed of 8, 16, or sometimes 32 cells, held together at their bases to form a sack globular colony surrounded by mucilage. The cells are ovoid or slightly narrowed at one end to appear keystone- or pear-shaped. Each cell has two flagella with two contractile vacuoles at their base, an eyespot, and a large cup-shaped chloroplast with at least one pyrenoid. 

  
The colonies co-ordinate their flagellar movement to create a rolling, swimming motion. Pandorina shows the beginnings of the colony polarity and differentiation seen in Volvox since the anterior cells have larger eyespots. Molecular sequencing has shown that Pandorina is paraphyletic with respect to Volvulina.

Asexual reproduction is by simultaneous division of all cells of the colony to form autocolonies that are liberated by a gelatinization of the colonial envelope. Sexual reproduction occurs by division of each cell of the colony into 16-32 zoogametes. Zoogametes show indications of heterogamy, a slight difference in the size and motility of the pairs that fuse to form the smooth walled zygote.

References

External links
Pandorina - description with pictures
algaebase on Pandorina
Coleman, A.W. (2001) "Biogeography and Speciation in the pandorina/volvulina (Chlorophyta) Superclade", Journal of Phycology, 37(5), October 2001, pp. 836–851

Chlamydomonadales
Chlamydomonadales genera